Kara Murat Şeyh Gaffar'a Karşı (Italian: Karamurat, la belva dell'Anatolia) is a 1976 Turkish-Italian costume drama-action film directed by Natuk Baytan. It's the fifth film in the series based on the comic strip character Kara Murat, a Janissary spy in the service of Mehmed the Conqueror, created by journalist and cartoonist Rahmi Turan. Turkish action film star Cüneyt Arkın played Kara Murat in all films of the series.

Plot
By the year 1456, Mehmed the Conqueror (Bora Ayanoğlu) has decided to extend the borders of his empire to the east, at the lands of the Aq Qoyunlu. However, Sheikh Gaffar (Pasquale Basile), ruler of a heretic sect near Kharput defies the Sultan's rule and imprisons the ambassadors sent by him. Sultan Mehmed commissions Kara Murat to assassinate Gaffar.

Cast
Cüneyt Arkın: Kara Murat (Karamurat)
Pasquale Basile: Gaffar (Mustafà)
Bora Ayanoğlu: Mehmed the Conqueror (Mammaluch)
Daniela Giordano: Zeynep (Suleima)
Turgut Özatay: Eşkiya Abdo (il bandito Alì Babà)

Production

Release

References

External links
Kara Murat Şeyh Gaffar'a Karşı (Kara Murat, La Belva Dell'Anatolia)

Karamurat, la belva dell'Anatolia

Turkish action adventure films
Italian action adventure films
1976 films
Films set in the Ottoman Empire
Films set in the 1450s
1970s action adventure films
Italian multilingual films
Turkish multilingual films
Italian historical action films
Turkish swashbuckler films
1970s historical adventure films
Films set in Turkey
1970s Turkish-language films
1970s Italian-language films
1970s multilingual films
Films based on Turkish comics
Live-action films based on comics
Italian historical adventure films
Italian swashbuckler films
1970s Italian films